Melichthys is a small genus in the triggerfish family (Balistidae). Member species are found in the Indian Ocean, Pacific Ocean and even the Red Sea (M. niger). The Black triggerfish is the largest species in this genus at 45 cm in length and the Indian triggerfish is the smallest at 25 cm. Melichthys niger and Melichthys indicus are similar in appearance and are often confused.

Species
There are currently 3 recognized species in this genus:
 Melichthys indicus J. E. Randall & Klausewitz, 1973 (Indian triggerfish)
 Melichthys niger Bloch, 1786 (Black triggerfish)
 Melichthys vidua J. Richardson, 1845 (Pinktail triggerfish)

References

 
Taxa named by William John Swainson
Ray-finned fish genera